Complement component 1s (C1 esterase, activated complement C1s, complement C overbar 1r, C1s) is a protein involved in the complement system. C1s is part of the C1 complex. In humans, it is encoded by the C1S gene.

C1s cleaves C4 and C2, which eventually leads to the production of the classical pathway C3-convertase.

See also 
 C1q - another part of the C1 complex
 C1r - another part of the C1 complex
 MASP-2 - a protein similar to C1s, part of the lectin pathway

References

Further reading

External links 
 
 

Complement system
EC 3.4.21